Pakphum Wonjinda (13 May 1965) is a Thai film director, producer, screenwriter and CEO of the PAKPHUMJAI Co., Ltd. His first screenplay was for the horror-comedy, Body Jumper, which was based on a Thai ghost folktale. He made his directorial debut in 2004 with the musical-horror-comedy, Formalin Man. He then made the slasher film, Scared in 2005, followed up with another slasher, Video Clip in 2007, Who are you? in 2010, Like and Love in 2012, Pee Kao Pee Ook (2014), The Miror in 3D in 2015, and The Crown in 2016.

Filmography

References

External links
www.pakphumjai.co.th
 

Living people
Pakphum Wonjinda
Pakphum Wonjinda
1965 births